The 1901–02 United States collegiate men's ice hockey season was the 8th season of collegiate ice hockey.

Regular season

Standings

References

1901–02 NCAA Standings

External links
College Hockey Historical Archives

 
College